The Spoon River is a  tributary of the Illinois River in west-central Illinois in the United States. The river drains largely agricultural prairie country between Peoria and Galesburg. The river is noted for giving its name to the fictional Illinois town in the 1915 poetry work Spoon River Anthology by Edgar Lee Masters, who was from Lewistown, which is near the river.

The river rises in two short forks, the West Fork near Kewanee in southern Henry County, and the East Fork in Neponset Township in southwest Bureau County.

In 1857 Captain Charles H. Robinson collected a fiddle tune he heard at a country dance at Bradford, Illinois. He sent the tune to Edgar Lee Masters who passed it on to the Australian−American composer Percy Grainger. Grainger used it as the basis for his composition ″Spoon River″ written over the years 1919−1929. Several editions for concert band have been published.

See also
 List of Illinois rivers
 Spoon River Anthology

References

External links
Historic Illinois: Spoon River

Tributaries of the Illinois River
Rivers of Illinois
Rivers of Bureau County, Illinois
Rivers of Fulton County, Illinois
Rivers of Knox County, Illinois
Rivers of Stark County, Illinois